The mixed skeet was a shooting sports event held as part of the Shooting at the 1984 Summer Olympics programme. The competition was held between August 2 and 4, 1984 at the shooting ranges in Los Angeles. 69 shooters from 41 nations competed.

Results

References

Shooting at the 1984 Summer Olympics
1984 Skeet